The Devil's Daughter, also known as Pocomania, is a 1939 American film directed by Arthur H. Leonard.

Plot summary
The movie is set in Jamaica and begins with a group performing a song and then a cockfight.

Sylvia Walton (Ida James) of Harlem inherits a Jamaican banana plantation and returns to manage it. Her disinherited half-sister Isabelle (Nina Mae McKinney), who ran the plantation until their father's death, does not greet her. But Sylvia, her two rival suitors, and her comic-relief servant Percy are disturbed by the constant, growing sound of drums.

Nina Mae McKinney can be heard singing an excerpt of The Devil’s Daughter soundtrack on the album Jamaica Folk Trance Possession 1939-1961.

Cast
Nina Mae McKinney as Isabelle Walton
Jack Carter as Philip Ramsay
Ida James as Sylvia Walton
Hamtree Harrington as Percy Jackson
Willa Mae Lang as Elvira
Emmett 'Babe' Wallace as John Lowden
Francine Larrimore as Island girl

References

External links

1939 films
1930s English-language films
American black-and-white films
1930s romance films
1939 horror films
Films shot in Jamaica
Race films
American romance films
American horror films
Cockfighting in film
1930s American films